

Notes

References

Bibliography 
Rapp, S. H. Jr. (2016) The Sasanian World Through Georgian Eyes, Caucasia and the Iranian Commonwealth in Late Antique Georgian Literature, Sam Houston State University, USA, Routledge, 
Rayfield, D. (2013) Edge of Empires: A History of Georgia, Reaktion Books, 

Georgian family trees
Bagrationi dynasty of the Kingdom of Georgia
Bagrationi dynasty